Mornago is a comune (municipality) in the Province of Varese, in the Italian region of Lombardy. It is about 45 km northwest of Milan and about 10 km southwest of Varese. It has a population of 5011 inhabitants and an area of 12  km².

Mornago contains the frazione (subdivision) of Crugnola, Montonate and Vinago, and borders the municipalities of Arsago Seprio, Besnate, Casale Litta, Crosio della Valle, Sumirago and Vergiate.

Public Holiday 
29th of September of every year

Saint patron 
San michele arcangelo

Demographic evolution

Twin towns — sister cities
Mornago is twinned with:

  Naxxar, Malta

Neighboring municipalities 

 Vergiate 5.6km
 Arsago Seprio 6.9km
 Sumirago 2.5km
 Casale Litta 2.1km
 Crosio della Valle 1.6km
 Besnate 5.8km

References

External links
 www.comune.mornago.va.it

Cities and towns in Lombardy